Rafał Andraszak (born 5 February 1978, in Słupsk) is a Polish footballer who currently plays for Flota Świnoujście in the Polish First League.

References
 

1978 births
Living people
Polish footballers
Amica Wronki players
Górnik Zabrze players
Association football forwards
Sportspeople from Słupsk